Kutchmitra is a Gujarati language daily published from Bhuj, Kutch district, Gujarat, India. It is owned by Janmabhoomi media group.

References

External links
  

Gujarati-language newspapers published in India
Kutch district
1947 establishments in India
Publications established in 1947
Newspapers published in Gujarat